Vladislav Ruslanovich Makoyev (born 20 October 1982) is a former Russian professional football player.

Club career
He made his Russian Football National League debut for FC KAMAZ Naberezhnye Chelny on 16 April 2004 in a game against FC Dynamo Bryansk.

External links
 
 

1982 births
Living people
Russian footballers
Association football goalkeepers
FC Spartak Vladikavkaz players
FC KAMAZ Naberezhnye Chelny players
FC Armavir players